This article lists the squads of all participating teams in the 2020–21 FIH Pro League. The nine national teams involved in the tournament were required to register a squad of up to 32 players.

Argentina
The following is the Argentina squad for the 2020 FIH Pro League.

Head coach: Carlos Retegui

Australia
The following is the Australia squad for the 2020 FIH Pro League.

Head coach: Paul Gaudoin, replaced in 2021 by Katrina Powell

Belgium
The following is the Belgium squad for the 2020 FIH Pro League.

Head coach: Niels Thiessen, replaced in September 2020 by  Raoul Ehren

China
The following is the China squad for the 2020 FIH Pro League.

Head coach: Wang Yang

Germany
The following is the Germany squad for the 2020 FIH Pro League.

Head coach:  Xavier Reckinger

Great Britain
The following is the Great Britain squad for the 2020 FIH Pro League.

Head coach:  Mark Hager

Netherlands
The following is the Netherlands squad for the 2020 FIH Pro League.

Head coach:  Alyson Annan

New Zealand
The following is the New Zealand squad for the 2020 FIH Pro League.

Head coach:  Graham Shaw

United States
The following is the United States squad for the 2020 FIH Pro League.

Head coach: Caroline Nelson-Nichols, replaced in 2021 by  Anthony Farry

 

* indicates players no longer listed to compete

References

Women's FIH Pro League squads
Squads